Río Cañas Arriba is a barrio in the municipality of Juana Díaz, Puerto Rico. Its population in 2010 was 2,165.

History
Puerto Rico was ceded by Spain in the aftermath of the Spanish–American War under the terms of the Treaty of Paris of 1898 and became an unincorporated territory of the United States. In 1899, the United States Department of War conducted a census of Puerto Rico finding that the population of Río Cañas Arriba barrio was 990.

Features
Río Cañas Arriba is close enough to the Guayabal reservoir that if the reservoir were to overfill, and the dam's overfill doors automatically opened, residents would have a short time to evacuate. The torrential rains of Hurricane Laura in August 2020 almost caused the reservoir's doors to automatically open and residents were on alert.

See also

 List of communities in Puerto Rico

References

Barrios of Juana Díaz, Puerto Rico